Cnemaspis kamolnorranathi , also known as Kamolnorranath's rock gecko, is a species of gecko endemic to central Thailand.

References

kamolnorranathi
Reptiles described in 2010
Taxa named by Kirati Kunya